Romolo Panfi (1632 in Florence – 1690 in Carmignano) was an Italian painter, active in Tuscany. He was active mainly as a battle painter and landscapes.

He was a pupil of Jacopo Vignali and worked in the Medici court of Grand Duke Ferdinand and his brother, Cardinal Leopoldo de' Medici, where Panfi was said to be talented as a musician and dancer. One of his pupils was Giovanni Camillo Sagrestani

References

1632 births
1690 deaths
17th-century Italian painters
Italian male painters
Painters from Florence